Platania is a village in southern Greece, situated in the administrative region of the Peloponnese and the regional unit of Messenia. Up to 2011 it was a municipal unit of the municipality of Avlonas. Since the 2011 local government reform, it is part of the municipality of Trifylia. The population of the village is 123 people (2011). The post code is 240 21.

References 

Populated places in Messenia
Villages in Greece